A void galaxy is a galaxy located in a cosmological void. Few galaxies exist in voids; most are located in sheets, walls and filaments that surround voids and supervoids. Many void galaxies are connected through void filaments or tendrils, lightweight versions of the regular galaxy filaments that surround voids. These filaments are often straighter than their regular counterparts due to the lack of influence by surrounding filaments. These filaments can even be rich enough to form poor groups of galaxies. The void galaxies themselves are thought to represent pristine examples of galactic evolution, having few neighbours, and likely to have formed from pure intergalactic gas.

Formation
It is theorised by many astrophysicists that void galaxies are the result of large galactic filaments being pulled by the gravity of a major super cluster out of the less densely populated areas causing voids such as the Boötes Void to grow, galaxies such as MCG+01-02-015 are sometimes left behind from events such as these.

List of void galaxies

References

Galaxies
Galaxy